Neuticles are prosthetic testicular implants for neutered dogs and other domestic animals. The implants may be made of polypropylene or silicone.

History
Gregg Miller developed the idea for Neuticles after his bloodhound, Buck, was castrated to stop his wandering. Miller, along with a veterinarian, patented the procedure for implanting Neuticles. To sell his idea, Miller established CTI (Canine Testicular Implant) Corporation, and the first commercial Neuticles were implanted in 1995. Miller won the 2005 Ig Nobel Prize in Medicine, a parody of the real Nobel Prize, for the invention of Neuticles.

The company states that humans cannot legally get Neuticles; while the materials in them are approved by the FDA, a second approval is required for similar implants in any specific areas of the human body. In 2018 it was reported that Miller has no plans for Neuticles for humans due to the cost and the time needed for FDA approval.

Opposition

In the UK, the regulatory body for veterinarians, the Royal College of Veterinary Surgeons, states that the use of any form of cosmetic surgery is unethical.

The Veterinary Council of New Zealand says "the insertion of neuticles (prosthetic testicles) cannot be justified. This procedure has no benefit to the animal and can be used to conceal genetic defects."

Popular culture
 On the reality television show Keeping Up with the Kardashians, Kim Kardashian's dog, Rocky, was given Neuticles.
On Season 2, Episode 10 “High School Reunion” of the television comedy  The League, Kevin publishes in the group's high school reunion program that Andre had a “nudicle” inserted after he was “sack-tapped so hard that my left testicle was damaged and eventually had to be removed.”

References

External links

Neuticles web site
 

Veterinary castration
American inventions
Prosthetics
Prosthetic manufacturers